Pultenaea pinifolia is a species of flowering plant in the family Fabaceae and is endemic to the south-west of Western Australia. It is an erect, slender shrub with pine-like leaves and yellow-orange flowers with orange marks.

Description

Taxonomy and naming
Pultenaea pinifolia was first formally described in 1848 by Carl Meissner in Lehmann's Plantae Preissianae. The specific epithet (pinifolia) means "pine-leaved".

Distribution and habitat
This pultenaea grows on floodplains and in swampy areas in the Esperance Plains, Jarrah Forest, Swan Coastal Plain and Warren biogeographic regions of south-western Western Australia.

Conservation status
Pultenaea pinifolia is classified as "Priority Three" by the Government of Western Australia Department of Parks and Wildlife meaning that it is poorly known and known from only a few locations but is not under imminent threat.

References

pinifolia
Eudicots of Western Australia
Plants described in 1848
Taxa named by Carl Meissner